Prasophyllum truncatum, commonly known as the truncate leek orchid, is a species of orchid endemic to Tasmania. It has a single tubular, dark green leaf and up to twenty whitish flowers with purplish and greenish-brown markings. It is a late-flowering leek orchid and its flowering is stimulated by earlier fire.

Description
The edges of the upturned part of the labellum have crinkled edges and there is a greenish-yellow, fleshy, raised callus in its centre extending just past the bend. Flowering occurs from November to March, more prolifically after fire.

Taxonomy and naming
Prasophyllum truncatum was first formally described in 1840 by John Lindley from a specimen collected near Stanley and the description was published in The genera and species of Orchidaceous plants. The specific epithet (truncatum) is a Latin word meaning "maimed" or "cut off".

Distribution and habitat
The truncate leek orchid widely distributed but uncommon, growing with shrubs and herbs in woodland in both the north and south of Tasmania.

References

External links 
 
 

truncatum
Flora of Tasmania
Endemic orchids of Australia
Plants described in 1840